"Indiana, Our Indiana" is the official school fight song  of Indiana University.  The lyrics were written by IU band director, Russell P. Harker, to the tune of the trio from "The Viking March" by Karl King, conductor of the Barnum and Bailey Circus Band.

One notable difference between the trio from "The Viking March" and the fight song as played by the Marching Hundred is that in the original Viking March, the third phrase of the trio ends in a tonic chord, whereas the third phrase of "Indiana, Our Indiana" ends in a major mediant chord. Some rival bands, such as the Ohio State University Marching Band, frequently overlook this detail when performing Indiana, Our Indiana.

The song was first performed by the IU Band during a football game against Northwestern University in November 1912.

Lyrics

References

Big Ten Conference fight songs
American college songs
College fight songs in the United States
Indiana University